List of works by or about American film critic Richard Brody.

Books

Essays and reporting

2000–2004

2005–2014
  Reviews Charlie Chaplin's A Countess from Hong Kong (1967) and Manoel de Oliveira's A Talking Picture (2003).
  Reviews Jacques Rivette's The Story of Marie and Julien (2003) and Chantal Akerman’s Tomorrow We Move (2004).
  Reviews Robert Luketic's Win a Date with Tad Hamilton! (2004) and Peyton Reed's Down with Love (2003).
 
 
 
 
 
 
 
 
 
 
 
  Reviews Jacques Tati’s Playtime (1967).
  Reviews Peyton Reed’s The Break-Up (2006).
  Reviews Jean-Luc Godard's Hail Mary (1985) and Jared Hess' Nacho Libre (2006).
  Reviews Howard Hawks' Sergeant York (1941).
  Reviews Yasuzo Masumura's Red Angel (1966).
  Reviews Rainer Werner Fassbinder's World on a Wire (1973).
  Reviews Douglas Sirk's All I Desire (1953) and There's Always Tomorrow (1956).
  Some films inspired by the 1962 Oberhausen Manifesto.
 
  Reviews Edgar Morin and Jean Rouch's Chronicle of a Summer (1960).
 
  Reviews Charlie Chaplin's Monsieur Verdoux (1947).
  Reviews D. A. Pennebaker's Dont Look Back (1967).
  Reviews Maurice Pialat's Under the Sun of Satan (1987).
  Reviews Raoul Walsh's Pursued (1947).
  Reviews Joseph L. Mankiewicz's Cleopatra (1963).
  Reviews Alfred Hitchcock's The Lodger (1927).
  Reviews D. W. Griffith's Intolerance (1916).
 
 
 
 
 
 
  Reviews Tsai Ming-Liang's Journey to the West (2014).
  Reviews Nathan Silver's Soft in the Head.
 
  Reviews Mahamat-Saleh Haroun's GriGris (2013).

2015–2019
  Reviews Kathleen Collins' Losing Ground (1982).
 
 
 
 
 
  Reviews Terence Davies' Sunset Song (2015).
 
 
 
 
 
 
 
 
  Reviews Antonino D'Ambrosio's Frank Serpico, Dan Lindsay and T. J. Martin's LA 92, and Pacho Velez and Sierra Pettengill's The Reagan Show.
 
  Reviews Michael Cimino's Thunderbolt and Lightfoot (1974).
  Reviews Yuliya Solntseva's The Enchanted Desna (1960).
 
  Reviews Hu Bo's An Elephant Sitting Still (2018) and Khalik Allah's Black Mother (2018).
 
  Reviews Horace B. Jenkins' Cane River (1982).
  Reviews Marielle Heller's Can You Ever Forgive Me? (2018).
  Reviews Michael Palmieri and Donal Mosher's The Gospel of Eureka (2018).
  Reviews Robert Rodriguez's Alita: Battle Angel (2019).
 
  Reviews Mrinal Sen's Interview (1971).
  Reviews Patricia Mazuy's Travolta and Me (1993).

2020–
  Reviews Blake Edwards' Days of Wine and Roses (1962).
  Reviews short films by Leo Hurwitz.
  Reviews William Greaves's Ida B. Wells : a passion for justice (1989).
  Reviews Jean-Marie Straub's and Danièle Huillet's Sicilia! (1999).
  Reviews Jan Oxenberg's Thank You and Good Night (1992).
  Reviews Ying Liang's A Family Tour (2018).
  Reviews Joseph Mankiewicz's A Letter to Three Wives (1949).
  Reviews Francis Ford Coppola's Rumble Fish (1983).
  Reviews Mostafa Derkaoui's About Some Meaningless Events (1974).
  Reviews Courtney Stephens' Terra Femme.
  Reviews Dorothy Davenport's The Woman Condemned (1934).
  Reviews Nia DaCosta's Candyman (2021).
  Reviews Yasuzo Masumura's Giants and Toys (1958).
  Reviews Ernst Lubitsch's That Uncertain Feeling (1941).
  Reviews Miklós Jancsó's The Round-Up (1966).
  Reviews  and John Wax's   (2020).
  Reviews Kivu Ruhorahoza's Father's Day.
 
  Reviews Ricky D'Ambrose's The Cathedral (2022).
  Reviews Jerry Schatzberg's Street Smart (1987).

NewYorker.com columns

Interviews

Notes

Bibliographies by writer
Bibliographies of American writers